Telicomys is an extinct genus of rodent from the Solimões Formation, Brazil, South America.

Description 
The closest living relative to Telicomys is the pacarana.

Its name derives from Greek τηλικος + μυς = "a mouse [= rodent] of such a size".

References 

Prehistoric pacaranas
Miocene rodents
Prehistoric rodent genera
Miocene genera
Miocene mammals of South America
Huayquerian
Chasicoan
Mayoan
Miocene Brazil
Fossils of Brazil
Fossil taxa described in 1926